Kilpeck is a village and civil parish in the county of Herefordshire, England. On the 1st of April 2019 the parishes of Kenderchurch, St Devereux, Treville and Wormbridge were merged with Kilpeck.

The village is renowned for its small but outstanding Norman (Romanesque) church, SS Mary and David's, but also has the earthworks of a Norman motte and bailey castle that is no longer standing. The church is a Grade I listed building. There is a public house called the Kilpeck Inn, formerly known as the Red Lion Inn, situated in the centre of the village opposite the village green. Other amenities include a village hall and post office.

History
Until the 9th century, when it was taken over by Mercia, the area around Kilpeck was within the Welsh kingdom of Ergyng. After the Norman conquest, the area became known as Archenfield and was governed as part of the Welsh Marches. It became part of Herefordshire, and England, in the 16th century, although the use of Welsh in the area remained strong until the 19th century. The English name for the village derives from the Welsh name, Llanddewi Kil Peddeg, with Llanddewi meaning "church of St. David" and Kil Peddeg probably meaning the "cell of Pedic", an otherwise unknown local early Christian hermit.

In the Domesday Book of 1086, Kilpeck (entered as Chipeete) was given by William the Conqueror to William Fitz Norman de la Mare, son of Norman de la Mare. The clan de la Mare is one of the oldest in Normandy and is descended from Ragnvald Eysteinsson, earl of Møre and Romsdal.  According to the Domesday survey, Kilpeck had "3 ploughs, 2 serfs and 4 oxmen and there are 57 men with 19 ploughs." There are mentions of a church on the site possibly from as early as the 7th century. There are vestiges of an enclosure, 200 yds (183 metres) by 300 yds (274 m) in the field, defining an Anglo-Saxon village.

Landmarks

The St Mary and St David's Church was built around 1140. It consists of a nave, chancel and semicircular apse. It is remarkable for its wealth (and fine preservation) of Norman stone carvings, both inside and out, all original both in form and position and incorporating many corbels with representations of human faces, hares, fish, fowl, stags etc. Eighty-five of 91 corbels survive, an extraordinarily high percentage.

West of the church lies a ruined motte-and-bailey and earthworks. The castle is thought to have been first built around 1090 as the administrative centre of Archenfield.  A few walls of the 12th or 13th-century keep still stand on top of the motte; these are not well preserved. A fireplace and chimney flues are visible and two sections of standing castle walls.

A little over a mile to the north is the surviving motte of another castle, at Didley Court Farm.

References

External links
 Renn, D. F. "Kilpeck Castle and Church". Castles of Wales.
 "Kilpeck Castle". Castles of Herefordshire. Archaeological survey.
 Population figures (PDF)

Villages in Herefordshire
Civil parishes in Herefordshire